Carlos Cordeiro (born 1956) is a sports executive. He was the president of the United States Soccer Federation (USSF) from February 10, 2018 until March 12, 2020 when he resigned after criticism over the legal stance taken by U.S. Soccer under his administration towards the U.S. women's national team.

Biography

Cordeiro was born to a Colombian mother and father of Indo-Portuguese descent  in Bombay. He moved to Miami at the age of 15 and is a graduate of Harvard University, where he earned an AB and MBA. Prior to joining the USSF in 2007 as an independent director, Cordeiro was a partner at Goldman Sachs and an independent director at BHP.

References

1956 births
Indian emigrants to the United States
Harvard Business School alumni
Living people
Presidents of the United States Soccer Federation
American people of Portuguese descent
American people of Colombian descent
People from Mumbai
People from Miami
BHP people
Goldman Sachs people